The Acura RDX is a compact luxury crossover SUV produced by Acura, a luxury vehicle division of Honda, as the second crossover SUV offering from the brand after the mid-size MDX.  Initially sharing its platform with the Honda Civic and CR-V, with the third generation, the RDX uses its own platform.

First generation (TB1/2; 2007) 

Originally previewed as the Acura RD-X concept car, the production RDX had its debut at the 2006 New York Auto Show and went on sale on August 11, 2006. A facelifted 2010 model went on sale in August 2009, which featured the addition Acura's "power plenum" grille and a front-wheel drive option.

Engine 
At the time, this was uncommon among Honda vehicles.

The K23A1 engine has all-aluminum construction, an i-VTEC head, and dual balance shafts.  It was also one of the only four-cylinder powered luxury SUVs of its generation.  Honda's variable flow turbocharger reduces turbo lag by using a valve to narrow the exhaust passage at low rpm, increasing the velocity of the exhaust flow and keeping the turbine spinning rapidly.  At higher rpm, the valve opens to allow more exhaust flow for increased boost. The engine also features a top-mounted intercooler which receives air from the grille, channeled by ducting under the hood.

The U.S. Environmental Protection Agency (EPA) estimated fuel mileage is  city and  highway miles per gallon. An updated EPA mileage estimate in February 2007 rated the RDX at  city and  highway.

Drivetrain 

The first-generation RDX featured a version of Acura's Super Handling All-Wheel Drive (SH-AWD) and a five-speed automatic transmission with Acura's SportShift sequential shift capability, activated by paddles mounted on the steering wheel for 2007-2009 models (additionally FWD was offered in some trims for 2010-2012 models).  The paddles can be used in Drive (D) to make a gear change with the transmission returning to automatic mode as soon as the vehicle resumes a steady-cruise state. The Sport (S) setting has higher shift points and quicker downshifts, and using a paddle in “Sport” immediately puts the transmission in fully-manual mode. The four-cylinder engines in the first-generation RDX all use a timing chain, whereas the V6 installed in subsequent years (2013-2018) all use timing belts.

Interior 

The vehicle's interior includes standard leather seating, a moonroof, automatic climate control, and all the expected power features.  The RDX 7-speaker audio system features XM Satellite Radio, along with an in-dash 6-CD changer, which is capable of playing standard Audio CDs, and Data-CDs burned with either MP3 or WMA files, it also plays DVD-A type CDs.

Much of the interior technology originally introduced in the RL sedan was equipped in the optional "Technology Package". This package included Acura's navigation system, a backup camera, XM Nav-Traffic real-time traffic monitoring, and Zagat restaurant reviews.  The package also featured a 10-speaker ELS Surround audio system with DTS and Dolby Pro Logic II surround sound. Both stereos included a 1/8" (a 3.5mm) auxiliary input jack used to plug in external sources such as iPods.  For 2007, Acura also offered an iPod adapter for the RDX, which was wired into the glove box, and allowed the iPod to be controlled through the RDX's sound system interface. Due to hardware incompatibilities, the Honda/Acura iPod music link was discontinued for the 2008 model year. The 2010-12 models featured a USB connection that interfaces with iPods and other USB mass storage devices, such as flash drives that contain MP3, WMA6, or AAC music files while being stored in the center console.

Safety 
The first-generation RDX was the second Acura vehicle to feature the Advanced Compatibility Engineering (ACE) body structure, which is designed to absorb energy from a collision. Standard safety features include six airbags, including dual front airbags, front side airbags, and dual-side curtain airbags. The front airbags use a dual-threshold, dual-stage technology that can adjust the timing and speed of each airbag deployment depending on the degree of impact and the driver's or front passenger's seat belt usage.  If sensors deem the front passenger is too small (less than ), the front airbag is designed not to deploy. The front passenger's side airbag is also designed to shut off if a child or small-statured adult is leaning into the airbag's deployment path. In the event of a sufficient side impact or roll-over, the side curtain airbag deploys from above the door frames of the affected side, with coverage for both the front and rear occupants on that side, and stays inflated longer than if there were a collision.

Front seats feature active head restraints and their seat belts are equipped with pre-tensioners and force limiters. In November 2006, the RDX was crash-tested by the U.S. National Highway Traffic Safety Administration, resulting in a perfect "5 Star" rating for driver and passenger frontal crashes, and front and rear side impacts, along with "4 Stars" for rollover.

The Insurance Institute for Highway Safety, Highway Loss Data Institute (IIHS-HLDI) gave the 2007-12 RDX the grade of Good "G" for moderate overlap front test and side impact test. The grade of Marginal "M" was given for roof strength evaluation.

Second generation (TB3/4; 2013) 

The second generation RDX was revealed during January 2012 at the North American International Auto Show going on sale in April. The turbocharged four-cylinder engine was replaced by a 3.5-liter V6 mated to a six-speed automatic, improving gas mileage to an EPA estimated 20/28/23 mpg (city/highway/combined) by using variable displacement (VCM). The SH-AWD system was replaced with a simpler and less costly AWD setup.

A 5-inch display, tri-angle rear-view backup camera are standard, as well as keyless entry with push-button start. Also, standard Bluetooth hands-free calling and Pandora music can be streamed wirelessly into the audio system. When upgrading to the Technology package, a power tailgate is included, along with an upgraded 60-gigabyte hard disc (HDD) based navigation system with 8-inch screen, this system enables 15GB of music to be stored.

In China, the RDX is offered with two engines. Both engine choices come with either FWD or AWD.

2016 Facelift
The refreshed 2016 RDX was introduced at the 2015 Chicago Auto Show, sales began in mid-April. The exterior adds LED headlamps (low and high beams, DRL pipe and amber turn signals) and LED taillamps. Additionally, the 2016 RDX includes several driver assists in the AcuraWatch package including Adaptive Cruise Control and Lane Keeping Assist System (LKAS). AWD was also updated to send up to 50% torque to rear wheels (on wet surfaces) opposed to up to 25% in the previous model.

Marketing
Acura and Marvel Entertainment, LLC, announced a joint promotional campaign with Marvel's The Avengers movie. Throughout Marvel's The Avengers, S.H.I.E.L.D. agents drive various Acura vehicles, including the MDX, ZDX, and TL models; the completely redesigned 2013 RDX was to make a cameo appearance in the movie but the scene did not make it in the final movie.  However, the Acura NSX concept convertible sports car made an appearance in the movie.

Safety

	

1 vehicle structure rated "Good"
2 strength-to-weight ratio: 5.48

Third generation (TC1/2; 2019) 

Acura debuted the 2019 RDX Prototype, on January 15, 2018, at the North American International Auto Show. Production of the RDX began in May 2018 at East Liberty, Ohio. The 2019 model arrived at dealerships across North America on June 1, 2018.

Equipment 

An A-Spec trim was offered which added aggressive body modifications, metal paddle shifters, larger wheels, and optional red leather interior with black alcantara inserts. This was the first Acura car to feature the company's True Touch Pad Interface infotainment system which features a 10.2 inch widescreen HD display. It is operated by a touchpad which operates differently from a traditional touchpad (like the one found on a laptop). The touchpad uses absolute positioning, which would mean that the finger placement corresponds with the position of the screen.

New features include Active Damper system, 360-degree surround-view exterior cameras, panoramic glass moonroof, acoustic front door glass, head-up display  4-way power lumbar front seats, and 16-way power front seats. For the 2021 model year, Acura included a new limited-edition trim level, called the PMC Edition.

Engine 
The front-wheel-drive 2019 RDX received an EPA fuel economy rating of  city/ highway/ combined mpg; the SH-AWD model, a  city/ highway/ combined rating.

Transmission 
The 2019 Acura RDX is equipped with a 10-speed automatic transmission that's also used in the Honda Accord. According to Honda, this allows the RDX to take the turbocharged engine to its maximum capabilities during low-end torque. There are wheel-mounted paddle shifters.

SH-AWD

The 2019 Acura RDX can be equipped with Acura's SH-AWD system. Acura had dropped the SH-AWD system in the second generation RDX for a non-torque vectoring AWD system. With the upgraded system, 70% of torque can be sent to the rear wheels with up to 100% of that torque applied to either rear wheel.

Safety 

The 2019/2020 RDX has been given an overall "G" or good rating by the Insurance Institute for Highway Safety (IIHS) Highway Loss Data. It was rated an IIHS Top Safety Pick+ in all trims except the Advance for 2019.  The Advance trim's curve-adaptive headlights only managed an "A" or acceptable rating due to excessive glare. Advance trim 2020 and on no longer featured the curve adaptive headlights.

Motorsport 
A one-off RDX made a run at Pike's Peak in Colorado featuring a  engine.

Facelift 
The RDX was facelifted in 2021, for the 2022 model year.

Sales

References

External links 

Official Acura News

RDX
Cars introduced in 2006
2010s cars
2020s cars
Compact sport utility vehicles
Luxury crossover sport utility vehicles
Front-wheel-drive vehicles
All-wheel-drive vehicles
Motor vehicles manufactured in the United States